Gernot Rumpf (born 1941) is a German sculptor known for his fountains and other bronze sculptures, with the Palatinate and biblical motifs. These can be seen not only in German cities, but also in Jerusalem and Tokyo. A part of his work came under the artistic collaboration of his wife Barbara Rumpf.

Education and work 

Born in Kaiserlautern, Rumpf studied at the Academy of Fine Arts, Munich from 1964 until 1970 under the guidance of Josef Henselmann and Hans Ladner. In 1965 he opened his own workshop for bronze casting. 1967 to 1969 there was a further development supported by the Studienstiftung des deutschen Volkes (German National Academic Foundation).

In 1973 Rumpf received a teaching assignment from the Kaiserslautern University of Technology, that was converted in 1979 to a professorship. In 1980 and 1983 he held a visiting professorship at the International Summer Academy in Salzburg.

Selected works in public space 
 
 
 
 
 
1989: Löwenbrunnen, Jerusalem
1990: Lederstrumpfbrunnen

Literature 

 
 
 
 
 
 
 Wolfgang Schütz: Koblenzer Köpfe, Lebensbeschreibungen über Personen der Stadtgeschichte und Namensgeber für Straßen und Plätze, Mülheim-Kärlich (Verlag für Anzeigenblätter) o.J., ohne ISBN, Seite 310, Artikel "Rumpf, Professor Gernot", dort eine Kurzbiographie von Gernot Rumpf sowie eine Besprechung des von Gernot und Barbara Rumpf kreierten "Erfinderbrunnens" (im Koblenzer Volksmund auch "Arche Noah" genannt"), in der Fischelpassage.

References

External links 

1941 births
Living people
German sculptors
German male sculptors
People from Kaiserslautern
Academy of Fine Arts, Munich alumni